Patrick Wiggins (born 1949) is an American amateur astronomer, and a discoverer of minor planets as well as supernovae. Wiggins worked as an educator at the Old Hansen Planetarium in Salt Lake City, Utah for 26 years before retirement.  he works for the University of Utah Department of Physics and Astronomy doing science outreach in the public schools.

Awards and honors 
 In 2014, Wiggins received the NASA Distinguished Public Service Medal, the highest honor NASA awards to a non employee.
 Asteroid 4099 Wiggins, discovered by Henri Debehogne at La Silla Observatory in 1988, was named in his honor. The official  was published by the Minor Planet Center on 6 January 2007.

References 
 

Discoverers of minor planets
1949 births
Living people
Amateur astronomers